Millerton Lake is an artificial lake near the town of Friant  about  north of downtown Fresno. The reservoir was created by the construction of 319 ft (97 m) high Friant Dam on the San Joaquin River which, with the lake, serves as much of the county line between Fresno County to the south and Madera County to the north.

Part of the Central Valley Project, the dam was built by the United States Bureau of Reclamation (USBR) and was completed in 1942 with the exception of the drum gates being installed in 1947. The lake stores water for irrigation, which is distributed by the Madera and Friant-Kern Canals to the San Joaquin Valley.

Secondary uses include flood control and recreation, including swimming, fishing, water skiing and camping. A 25 MW hydroelectric plant operated by the Friant Power Authority produces electricity from large releases and two smaller plants use water released for a fish hatchery and to maintain minimum-flow in the river.

Prior to the construction of Friant Dam, the current lake bed was the site of the town of Millerton, the first county seat of Fresno County.

The California Office of Environmental Health Hazard Assessment has issued a safe eating advisory for fish caught in the Millerton Lake due to elevated levels of mercury.

Environmental impacts
The desiccation of the river has caused the degradation of large stretches of riverside habitat and marshes, and has nearly eliminated the historic chinook salmon run that once reached about 15,000 fish each year. Reduction in flows has also increased the concentration of pesticide and fertilizer runoff in the river contributing to pollution that has further impacted aquatic species.

On September 13, 2006, after eighteen years of litigation, environmental groups, fisherman and the USBR reached an agreement on releasing part of the water currently diverted into the irrigation canals into the San Joaquin River in order to help restore the river and its native fish and wildlife. However, the river restoration project will cause a 12–20% reduction in irrigation water delivered from Friant Dam.

See also
List of dams and reservoirs in California
List of lakes in California
List of largest reservoirs of California
Temperance Flat Dam Proposed extension of Millerton Lake.

References

External links
Current Conditions, Millerton Reservoir
Friant Water Authority
Millerton Lake State Recreation Area
Map of lake expansion proposals
Millerton Lake Fishing

Reservoirs in Fresno County, California
Reservoirs in Madera County, California
San Joaquin River
Central Valley Project
Reservoirs in California
Reservoirs in Northern California